Daddy is a 2017 Indian political crime drama film co-written and directed by Ashim Ahluwalia. The film stars Arjun Rampal, who also co-wrote and produced the film, portraying gangster-turned-politician Arun Gawli. It also stars Aishwarya Rajesh in the lead role.

The official teaser of the film was released on 1 December 2016. Daddy is presented by Kundalini Entertainment and Karta Entertainment. The  movie released worldwide on 8 September 2017, to a positive response from the critics and audiences alike, even if, grossing some worldwide 15 odd crores for a budget of 21 crores, it was declared a box-office flop.

Plot  
In the 1960s and late 1970s, when Mumbai's textile mills were shutting down one after the other, many unemployed youths, including Arun Gawli (Arjun Rampal) resort to matka-gambling on the insistence of his friends, Rama Naik (Rajesh Shringarpure) and Babu Reshim (Anand Ingale), to earn some quick buck and form their own gang. However, soon, Gawli finds himself getting trapped in a vortex of crime when he is taken under the wings of Maqsood Bhai (Farhan Akhtar, loosely modelled on Dawood Ibrahim) after committing a murder. Further, their clashes of ideologies and power games turn them against each other. Meanwhile, Gawli marries his sweetheart Zubeida Mujawar (Aishwarya Rajesh), who coaxes him to leave behind his murky profession. He almost makes up his mind to turn clean. But, when Rama gets killed in a brutal police encounter, Gawli takes in charge of their gang based in Dagdi. He suspects that Rama's killing was engineered by Maqsood and thus begins a gruesome gang war between them. Hot on the heels is a cop, Vijaykar Nitin, who wants to nab Gawli at any cost and take him to the task. The rest of the plot revolves around how one of India's most feared gangsters landed up in politics and his transition to becoming 'Daddy'.

Cast
Arjun Rampal as Arun Gawli
Aishwarya Rajesh as Zubeida Mujawar / Asha Gawli
Nishikant Kamat as Inspector Vijaykar Nitin
Anand Ingale as Babu Reshim            
Rajesh Shringarpure as Rama Naik
Purnanand Wandekar as Vijay
Anupriya Goenka as Hilda
Mir Sarwar as Samaad Khan
Shruti Bapna as Rani
Usha Naik as Arun's Mother
Shrikant Yadav as Sada
Deepak Damle as Phamplet Bandya 
Girish Pal as Sachit
Raj Arjun as Rafique
Vijay Sanap as Salim Gurda
Abhimanyu Arun as Newman
Farhan Akhtar in a cameo appearance as Maqsood, loosely based on Dawood Ibrahim
Nataša Stanković in a special appearance in the song "Dance-Dance"

Release
The official teaser of the film was released on 1 December 2016. The trailer of the film was released on 13 June 2017.

Soundtrack 

The film was praised by the critics, but it was declared a box office flop because it only made 15 crore from a budget of 21 crore

References

External links
 
 

2017 biographical drama films
2010s Hindi-language films
Crime films based on actual events
Indian crime drama films
Political films based on actual events
2017 films
Indian biographical drama films
Films with screenplays by Ritesh Shah
2017 crime drama films
Political action films